Another World is the second solo album by Queen guitarist Brian May, released on 1 June 1998 by Parlophone Records in the UK, and on 15 September 1998 by Hollywood Records in the US. May dedicated it to his mother. The song "Business" was the theme song of the first season of the comedy-drama series Frank Stubbs Promotes, and the track "On My Way Up" was used for its second season.

Overview
Recorded at his home studio after the completion of the last Queen album, Made in Heaven, the album was released in the UK on 1 June 1998 and on 15 September of that year in the US.

The album itself started as a cover album. The "Heroes" concept was to record May's favourite tracks from his favourite artists, but the idea soon mutated into a full album. Some of the covers found their place on the album, whilst others were released as B-sides, on the Retro Rock Special EP, as Japanese bonus tracks and on the Red Special tour promo CD.

As part of promotion for the album and tour, May appeared as himself in the final episode of the BBC comedy sketch show Smith and Jones in October 1998.

Drummer Cozy Powell, with whom Brian May worked on the album, died in a car accident before the album was completed. The song "Business" was released as a single as a tribute to Cozy.

Reissue
In February 2022, May announced that the album would be reissued as part of the ongoing Brian May Gold Series, packaged with a second disc of bonus tracks titled Another Disc. The reissue was released on 22 April.

Track listing

Personnel
Brian May – vocals, guitars, keyboards, bass guitar, programming
Cozy Powell – drums on "Business", "China Belle", "The Guv'nor", "Slow Down", "One Rainy Wish", and "All The Way From Memphis", drums and percussion on "Why Don't We Try Again?"
Steve Ferrone – drums on "Another World"
Neil Murray – bass guitar on "China Belle", "Slow Down", "One Rainy Wish", and "All The Way From Memphis"
Ken Taylor – bass guitar on "Another World"
Jamie Moses – guitar on "Slow Down"
Spike Edney – keyboards on "Slow Down"
London Metropolitan Orchestra – strings on "One Rainy Wish", conducted by Michael Kamen
Cathy Porter – backing vocals on "On My Way Up"
Shelley Preston – backing vocals on "On My Way Up" and "All the Way from Memphis"
Nikki Love – backing vocals on "All the Way from Memphis"
Becci Glover – backing vocals on "All the Way from Memphis"
Taylor Hawkins – drums on "Cyborg"
Jeff Beck – guitar on "The Guv'nor"
Ian Hunter – guest raconteur on "All the Way from Memphis"

Production
Arrangement and production by Brian May
Engineering and co-production by Justin Shirley-Smith
Recorded at the Allerton Hill Studio
Mastered by Kevin Metcalfe at Townhouse Studios
Design and photography – Richard Gray
Equipment supervision, maintenance, stuff – Pete Malandrone

Charts

References

1998 albums
Brian May albums
Parlophone albums
Hollywood Records albums